Gamalakhe is a township situated about  inland on the South Coast of KwaZulu-Natal Province, South Africa.

Geography
It is located 19 km from Port Shepstone and 15 km from Margate. Surrounding communities include Nsimbini in the north-west, Qina in the north-east and Nositha in the south which are all rural communities. The nearest urban settlements are Uvongo, Shelly Beach and Margate. It is also located north of the Vungu River

Public Infrastructure
The township has 8 schools, 4 secondary schools and 4 primary schools. These schools include Olwandle High School which was crowned the champion of the Top 23 Schools Soccer Tournaments KZN in 2015. The township has a Community Health Centre, shopping centre, Post Office, Public Library, Social Development Offices, Civic Centre, Police Station and Public Swimming Pool.

Primary Schools          
Sethembinkosi J.P School
Hlangeni Primary School
Buhlebezwe Primary School
Nsimbini Primary School

secondary schools
Olwandle secondary school
Galeni secondary school
Commercial secondary school
Vezubuhle secondary schools

References

It's hss a stop called depho

Populated places in the Ray Nkonyeni Local Municipality